James G. Van Valkenburgh House is a historic home located at Chatham in Columbia County, New York.  It was built in 1843 and is a Greek Revival–style residence.  It is a large, 2-story, five-bay center-entrance, two-bay-deep, frame dwelling with a large -story service wing.  The main entry features a single-story open porch with four fluted Doric order columns and a deep entablature.  Also on the property are a garage, two barns, and a well house.

It was added to the National Register of Historic Places in 2002.

References

Houses on the National Register of Historic Places in New York (state)
Greek Revival houses in New York (state)
Houses completed in 1843
Houses in Columbia County, New York
1843 establishments in New York (state)
National Register of Historic Places in Columbia County, New York